Hemidactylus endophis is a species of house gecko from Oman.

References

External links
Reptile Database

Hemidactylus
Reptiles of the Middle East
Reptiles described in 2012